is a 1979 Japanese film in Nikkatsu's Roman porno series, directed by Kichitaro Negishi and starring Junko Miyashita.

Synopsis
Miyashita plays an office clerk who is having an affair with her married boss. Since he refuses to leave his wife, Miyashita and another couple plan to kidnap his daughter to collect a ransom.

Cast
 Junko Miyashita as Shimako Maruyama
 Aoi Nakajima as Noriko Goto
 Junichiro Yamashita as Junichiro Goto
 Ako as Tokiko Kazama

Background
The Weisser's, in their book Japanese Cinema Encyclopedia: The Sex Films, remark that many critics saw similarities between this work and Akira Kurosawa's 1960 film The Bad Sleep Well.

Awards and nominations
4th Hochi Film Award 
 Won: Best Actress - Junko Miyashita
1st Yokohama Film Festival 
 Won: Best Supporting Actress - Ako
 9th Best Film

References

External links
 
 

1979 films
Films directed by Kichitaro Negishi
1970s Japanese-language films
Nikkatsu films
Nikkatsu Roman Porno
1970s Japanese films